Royal elections in Poland (Polish: wolna elekcja, lit. free election) were the elections of individual kings, rather than dynasties, to the Polish throne. Based on traditions dating to the very beginning of the Polish statehood, strengthened during the Piast and Jagiellon dynasties, they reached their final form in the Polish–Lithuanian Commonwealth period between 1572 and 1791. The "free election" was abolished by the Constitution of 3 May 1791, which established a constitutional-parliamentary monarchy.

Evolution 

The tradition of electing the country's ruler, which occurred either when there was no clear heir to the throne, or to confirm the heir's appointment, dates to the very beginning of Polish statehood. Legends survive of the 9th-century election of the legendary founder of the first Polish royal family, Piast the Wheelwright of the Piast dynasty, and similar voting of his son, Siemowit (that would place a Polish ruler's vote a century before the earliest Icelandic ones by the Althing). Still, sources for that time are very sparse, and it is hard to estimate whether those elections were more than a formality. The election privilege, exercised during the gatherings known as wiec, was usually limited to the most powerful nobles (magnates) or officials, and was heavily influenced by local traditions and strength of the ruler.

Traditions diverged in different regions of Poland during the period of fragmentation of Poland. In the Duchy of Masovia, the hereditary principle dominated, but in the Seniorate Province, elections became increasingly important. In the other provinces both elements mixed together. By the 12th or 13th century, the wiec institution limited participation to high-ranking nobles and officials. The nationwide wiec gatherings of officials in 1306 and 1310 can be seen as a precursor of the general sejm (Polish parliament).

The elections reinforced the empowerment of the electorate (the nobility), as the contender to the throne would increasingly consider issuing promises that he undertook to fulfil in the event of a successful election. Wenceslaus II of Bohemia made the first of such undertakings (the Litomyšl Privilege) in 1291. Nonetheless, for most of the Piast dynasty, electors customarily endorsed rulers from that dynasty, in accordance with hereditary descent. The Piast dynasty came to an end with the death without an heir of the last of the Polish Piasts of the main line, Casimir III the Great, in 1370.

In a milestone for the process of the free elections, Casimir's nephew, Louis I of Hungary, became king after the agreement between him, Casimir III the Great and the Polish nobility (Privilege of Buda). Louis had no sons, which created another dilemma for the succession of the Polish throne. In an attempt to secure the throne of Poland for his line, he gathered the nobles and sought their approval to have one of his daughters retained as the queen regnant of Poland in exchange for the Privilege of Koszyce (1374).

The next election of a Polish king had occurred in 1386, with the selection of Władysław II Jagiełło (Jogaila), Grand Duke of Lithuania, as the first king of Poland's second dynasty. The electors chose Władysław II Jagiełło as king, and he married a daughter of Louis I, Jadwiga of Poland, but had no promise that his dynasty would continue on the throne. He would need to issue more privileges to the nobility to secure the guarantee that upon his death, one of his sons would inherit. The royal council chose the candidates, and the delegates of nobility and towns confirmed them during the sejm. The principle of election continued in effect throughout the nearly two centuries of the Jagiellon Dynasty, but just as in Piast times, it actually amounted to mere confirmation of the incoming heir.

One could describe the monarchy of Poland at that time as "the hereditary monarchy with a[n] elective legislature." A major reason was the desire on the part of Polish nobility to retain the Polish–Lithuanian union, and the Jagiellon dynasty were the hereditary rulers of the Grand Duchy of Lithuania. Nonetheless, the pretense of having a choice by elections remained important for the nobility, and when in 1530 Sigismund I the Old attempted to secure the hereditary throne for his 10-year-old son, there was a political crisis, and the Polish parliament, the sejm, ruled that a new king could be chosen during the life of his predecessor (that became known in the Polish politics as the vivente rege).

In 1572, Poland's Jagiellon dynasty became extinct upon the death, without a successor, of King Sigismund II Augustus. During the ensuing interregnum, anxiety for the safety of the Commonwealth eventually led to agreements among the political classes that pending election of a new king, the Roman Catholic Primate of Poland would exercise supreme authority, acting as interrex (from the Latin); and that special "hooded" confederations (Polish: konfederacje kapturowe, named after the hoods traditionally worn by their members) of nobility would assume power in each the country's regions. Most importantly, however, the Poles decided that they would choose the next king by election, and they finally established the terms of such election at a convocation sejm (sejm konwokacyjny) in 1573. On the initiative of nobles from Southern Poland, supported by the future Great Crown Chancellor and hetman Jan Zamoyski, all male szlachta (nobles) who assembled for the purpose would become electors. Any Catholic nobleman could stand for election, but in practice, only rich and powerful members of foreign dynasties or Commonwealth magnates had a serious chance for consideration. With the election of the first king of the "free election" period, the elections assumed their final form, which would remain stable for the next two centuries.

Particularly in the late 17th and 18th centuries, the political instability from the elections led numerous political writers to suggest major changes to the system: most notably, to restrict the elections to Polish candidates only (that became known as the "election of a Piast"). None of the projects came into force, however. The Constitution of 3 May 1791 eliminated the practice of electing individuals to the monarchy.

Procedure
Three special sejms handled the process of the royal election in the interregnum period:
 Convocation sejm (Sejm konwokacyjny), called upon a death or abdication of a king by the Primate of Poland. Deputies would focus on establishing the dates and any special rules for the election (in particular, preparation of pacta conventa, bills of privileges to be sworn by the king) and on screening the candidates. It was to last two weeks.
 Election sejm (Sejm elekcyjny), when the nobility voted for the candidate to the throne. It was open to all members of the nobility and so it often had many more attendees than a regular sejm. The exact numbers of attendees were never recorded and are estimated to vary from 10,000 to over 100,000; the usual numbers tended to be towards the lower end of the scale, around 10,000-15,000. Subsequently, the voting could last days (in 1573, it was recorded that it took four days). The entire sejm was to last six weeks. To handle the increased numbers, it would be held in Wola, then a village near Warsaw. Royal candidates themselves would be barred from attending the sejm but were allowed to send representatives.   Attending nobles would have discussed their preferences before attending the election sejm, during local sejmiks sessions, but often, matters came to a heated debate that would last days and could lead to fights and battles. Norman Davies notes that "in 1764, when only thirteen electors were killed, it was said that the Election was unusually quiet."
 Coronation sejm (Sejm koronacyjny), held in Kraków, where the coronation ceremony was traditionally held by the Primate, who relinquished his powers to the chosen king. It was to last two weeks. The king-elect undertook various ceremonies and formalities, such as swearing an oath to uphold the pacta conventa and the  Henrician Articles. The coronation itself would take place in the Wawel Cathedral. The two exceptions were the Warsaw coronations of Stanisław I Leszczyński and Stanisław August Poniatowski (reigned as Stanisław II Augustus), both of which took place in Warsaw.

Influence
The elections played a major role in curtailing the power of the monarch and so were a significant factor in preventing the rise of an absolute monarchy, with a strong executive, in the Commonwealth. Most tellingly, one of the provisions of the pacta conventa included the right of revolution (rokosz) for the nobility if it considered the king not to be adhering to the laws of the state.

While seemingly introducing a very democratic procedure, free elections, in practice, contributed to the inefficiency of the Commonwealth's government. The elections, open to all nobility, meant that magnates, who could exert significant control on the masses of poorer nobility, could exert much influence over the elections.

The elections also encouraged foreign dynasties' meddling in Polish internal politics. On several occasions, if the magnates could not come to an agreement, two candidates would proclaim themselves the king and civil wars erupted (most notably, the War of the Polish Succession of 1733–1738, and the War of the Polish Succession of 1587–1588, with smaller scale conflicts in 1576 and 1697). By the last years of the Commonwealth, royal elections grew to be seen as a source of conflicts and instability; Lerski describes them as having "became a symbol of anarchy".

List of elections
In the period of the Polish–Lithuanian Commonwealth, 10 elections (composed of the convocation, election and coronation sejmik) were held in Poland, resulting in the elevation of 11 kings.

{| class="wikitable"
|-
! Convocation Sejm !! Election Sejm !! Coronation Sejm !! King elected(nationality, reign)!! Notes!!Other candidates
|-
| January 1573 || April 1573 || February 1574 || Henry III of France(French, 1573–1574) || First king of the Commonwealth. Abdicated to assume the throne of France.||
Archduke Ernest of Austria
John III of Sweden
Ivan IV of Russia
Feodor of Russia
Alfonso II of Ferrara
William of Rosenberg
Jerzy Jazłowiecki
Jan Kostka

|-
| August 1574 || November 1575 || March 1576 || Stephen Báthory(Hungarian, 1576–1586) || Also Prince of Transylvania. Married to Anna Jagiellon. Election disputed, led to the Danzig rebellion.||
Maximilian II, Holy Roman Emperor
Archduke Ernest of Austria
Ferdinand II, Archduke of Austria
John III of Sweden
Ivan IV of Russia
Feodor of Russia
Alfonso II of Ferrara

William of Rosenberg
|-
| February 1587 || June 1587  || December 1588 || Sigismund III Vasa(1587–1632) || Born in Sweden. Son of Catherine Jagiellon. Election disputed, led to the War of the Polish Succession (1587–88).||
Maximilian III, Archduke of Austria
Feodor I of Russia
Ferdinand II, Archduke of Austria
Archduke Matthias of Austria
Archduke Ernest of Austria
|-
| June 1632 || September 1632 || February 1633 || Władysław IV Vasa(1632–1648) || Son of Sigismund III.||
Gustavus Adolphus of Sweden
|-
| July 1648 || October 1648 || January 1649 || John II Casimir Vasa(1648–1668) || Son of Sigismund III and brother of Władysław IV. Abdicated.||

Karol Ferdynand Vasa
|-
| November 1668 || May 1669 || October 1669 || Michał Korybut WiśniowieckiMichael I(1669–1673) || ||
Louis, Prince of Condé
Henri Jules, Duke of Bourbon
Philip William, Count Palatine of Neuburg
Charles of Lorraine
Alexis of Russia
Tsarevich Alexei Alexeyevich of Russia
Feodor Alexeyevich of Russia
Christina of Sweden
Frederick William, Elector of Brandenburg
Adil Giray
James, Duke of York
Dymitr Jerzy Wiśniowiecki
Aleksander Janusz Zasławski
Aleksander Polanowski
|-
| January 1674 || April 1674 || February 1676 || John III Sobieski(1674–1696) || ||
Louis, Prince of Condé
Philip William, Count Palatine of Neuburg
Charles of Lorraine
Prince George of Denmark
Louis Thomas, Count of Soissons
Mihály Apafi
|-
| August 1696 || May 1697 || November 1697 || August II the Strong(Saxon, 1697–1706; 1709–1733) || Temporarily replaced by Stanisław I Leszczyński (1704–1709) due to the Great Northern War. Leszczyński's election was disputed and led to the Civil war in Poland (1704–1706).||
François Louis, Prince of Conti
Charles Philip of Palatinate-Neuburg
Leopold, Duke of Lorraine
Louis William, Margrave of Baden-Baden
James Louis Sobieski
Maximilian II Emanuel, Elector of Bavaria
Livio Odescalchi
|-
| April 1733 || August 1733 || January 1734 || Stanisław I Leszczyński(1733–1736) || Election disputed, led to the War of the Polish Succession, won by Augustus III of Poland (Saxon, 1733–1763), son of Augustus II.||
Infante Manuel, Count of Ourém
|-
| May 1764 || August 1764 || December 1764 || Stanisław August PoniatowskiStanisław II Augustus(1764–1795) || Last king of the Commonwealth. Abdicated.||
Frederick Christian, Elector of Saxony
Adam Kazimierz Czartoryski
Michał Kazimierz Ogiński
Jan Klemens Branicki
|}

See also
 Golden Liberty
 Presidential elections in Poland
 1573 Polish–Lithuanian royal election
 Electio Viritim Monument in Warsaw

References

External links

  Sebastian Adamkiewicz Skąd się wzięła elekcja viritim?  Wolne elekcje''

 
Polish monarchy
 
Sejm of the Polish–Lithuanian Commonwealth
Elective monarchy